is a Japanese Automotive products manufacturing company. Their business activities is focused on carburetors, fuel injectors and other automobile and motorcycle related equipment.

History and description
The firm was founded in 1923 and incorporated in 1948.

The company is best known for supplying carburetors to many major Japanese motorcycle manufacturers. 
It is also known for its licensed copies of Solex carburetors that were used on several Japanese cars.

Mikuni operates in Southeast Asia, especially in Thailand and Indonesia with motorcycle, scooter, and moped manufacturers Yamaha, Suzuki, Hyosung Motors & Machinery Inc., TVS Motor Company and Honda.

Notes and references

External links

Automotive companies based in Tokyo
Manufacturing companies based in Tokyo
Auto parts suppliers of Japan
Companies listed on the Tokyo Stock Exchange
Manufacturing companies established in 1923
Japanese companies established in 1923
Engine fuel system technology
Carburetor manufacturers
Japanese brands